Sopra Steria is a Paris-based consulting, digital services, and software development company. Sopra Steria has a new consulting wing under the “Next” brand. It employs 3,400 consultants across Europe, including 1,900 in the group’s native France. After adding the shares held directly in registered form by current and former Group employees, these proportions amount to nearly 10% of the share capital and 13% of voting rights, thereby making employees the Group’s second-largest shareholder.

History
Sopra was created in 1968, followed closely by the 1969 founding of Steria. SODERI (Information Research and Development Company) holds 51%, the BNP Group holds 29.5% and the Indochina Group holds 19.5%.

By 1971, Sopra signed its first large global banking managed services agreement, which led to the first banking platform the following year. Steria computerized Agence France-Presse in 1973 by creating a text processing system that enables real-time information transmission. After acquiring Sitintel in 1974, the group developed Minitel and eventually received its first major national project with the French Ministry of the Interior in 1986.

Steria's automation project for the RER A in Paris made it valuable enough to be registered on the Second Market of the Paris stock exchange (now the NYSE Euronext Paris) by 1990. Sopra set up its subsidiary, Axway Software, in 2001, through which the company expanded into the Enterprise Application Integration (EAI) market.

In 2014, Sopra and Steria officially merged into the Sopra Steria Group in August. On 31 December 2014, the legal merger of the two groups was complete. After the merger, Sopra Steria acquired CX-partners in 2019 and Fidor Solutions in 2020.

Sopra

Sopra was seated in Annecy, France. The company had a revenue of €1.349 billion (2013) and 16,290 (Dec. 2013) employees. It was founded in January 1968 by Pierre Pasquier, François Odin and Léo Gantelet. In March 2014, Sopra Group was renamed Sopra. In April 2014, Sopra announced a merger with Steria in an attempt to become the European leader in computer services. Sopra is a consulting, IT services, and software development company. Its subsidiary Sopra Banking Software develops and distributes software for the financial services market.

It runs three complementary business lines: consulting management and technology, systems integration, and software publishing in the following field in human resources and real estate management.

Sopra is focused on financial services; services, transportation, and utilities; public sector; industry; telecom and media; and retail as business sectors.

Acquisitions 
Sopra's main acquisitions are:
 SG2 Ingénierie (1996)
 Orga Consultants (2000)
 ITI and CS Rand (2001)
 Inforsud Ingénierie from the Crédit Agricole Group (2003)
 Valoris (2004)
 Newell & Budge (UK) and its subsidiaries in Ireland and India, IT services (2005) 
 100% of the share capital of PROFit SA (2005)
 CIBF (2008)
 100% of the share capital of Delta Informatique (2011)
 Callataÿ & Wouters (2012)
 British subsidiaries of Business & Decision and Tieto (2012)
 Callataÿ & Wouters and Delta Informatique (2012)
 HR Access (2013)
 COR&FJA Banking Solutions (2014)
 Merger with Steria (2014)
 CIMPA (2015)
 Cassiopae (2017)
 Kentor (2017)
 2MoRO (2017)
 Galitt (2017)
 BLUECARAT (2018)
 Sword Apak (2018)
 SAB (2019)
 Sodifrance (2020)
 Fidor Solutions (Fidor Bank) (2020)
 EVA Group (2021)
 EGGS Design (2021)
 Labs (2021)

Axway Software 
In 2001, Sopra used its subsidiary Axway to access the EAI market. The following year, Axway acquired Viewlocity Inc. From 2006 to 2008, it acquired Cyclone Commerce, Inc., Atos Origin, and Tumbleweed Communications Corp.

Axway Software split from Sopra in June 2011 after its stock market launch.

Steria

Groupe Steria SCA was a multinational information technology services company founded in 1969, based in Issy-les-Moulineaux, France. It focused on public services, finance, telecommunications, utilities and transport, and provided consulting services for its clients' core business processes.

Steria was created by Jean Carteron in 1969. Francois Enaud took over as chairman and CEO in 1998 and Steria listed itself in the Paris Stock Exchange the next year. In 2000, Steria acquired three service and telecom companies in France and became one of the top five French service providers. In 2001, Steria started the Foundation Steria, a community support group. In July 2007, Steria acquired the United Kingdom-based IT outsourcing and technology company Xansa for £472 million in cash. According to the terms of an agreement signed with AURELIUS on 20 October 2012, Steria completed the sale of its Spanish subsidiary on 28 November 2012.

Steria had sites in Austria, Belgium, Denmark, France, Germany, Hong Kong, India, Luxembourg, Morocco, Norway, Poland, Singapore, Switzerland, Sweden and United Kingdom.

The "Steria Corporate Center for Real-Time and Embedded Software expertise", located in Aix-en-Provence, France, focused on aeronautics (Eurocopter, Dassault), defense (DCNS, DGA) and transportation use products including QC (TEST DIRECTOR), SCADE and VAPS.

Services offered by Steria included applications management, infrastructure management, IT service management, business process outsourcing, testing and quality, cloud – Workplace on command, infrastructure on command, and security.

NHS Shared Business Services (NHS SBS) was a joint venture between Steria and the United Kingdom's Department of Health. It provided services in finance and accounting, payroll and human relations, family health services, and commercial procurement.

In May 2018, the UK's Minister of State for Immigration, Caroline Nokes, announced significant changes to the visa application submission process. In her statement, she announced the government would be outsourcing the immigration application process to Sopra Steria Group by October 2018.,

Controversies
In the UK, the National Audit Office found that NHS SBS first recognized in January 2014 that patients might have come to harm as a result of what was, at the time, a growing backlog of undelivered paperwork. Although staff raised concerns, the company did not alert the department or NHS England until March 2016. The NAO concluded that the company had been "obstructive and unhelpful" with regard to the subsequent inquiry launched by NHS England. In 2017, a UK Commons public accounts committee was informed that at least 12,000 missing papers – possibly including patient records and cancer tests – had not been processed by the company.

In 2019, several members of the British Parliament, concerned about "grave problems" in Sopra Steria's £91 million contract to manage post-Brexit biometric services for immigrants, wrote to the National Audit Office to request an urgent investigation into the quality of service, responding to allegations that the company was charging "extortionate" rates to the vulnerable.

Ransomware attack
On 20 October 2020, the company suffered a Ryuk ransomware attack. Using a new variant of Ryuk, the cybercriminals unsuccessfully tried to encrypt the company's data, making it inaccessible unless a ransom is paid. Ryuk has been described as "one of the most dangerous ransomware groups that operate through phishing campaigns".

Further reading 
Sopra Steria is part of GAIA-X (2021), a digital ecosystem regulated by its members. The initiative is working to create an environment in which data can be shared and stored under the control of data owners and users; and where rules are defined and respected, so that data and services can be made easily available, compiled and exchanged. Gaia-X has the potential to create unprecedented opportunities for innovative, data-driven business models and new solutions that help European industries and companies of all sizes to scale up and compete globally. The result will be a strong foundation for modern, next-generation infrastructure that meets the needs of business, science and society.

Environmental practices and initiatives 
For several years, Sopra Steria’s climate actions recognized by Carbon Disclosure Project with ‘A’ score.

References 

Information technology companies of France
International information technology consulting firms
Software companies of France
Software companies established in 1968
French companies established in 1968
Companies listed on Euronext Paris